Leonidas was the king of Sparta who ruled c. 489–480 BC. and leader at the battle of Thermopylae.

Leonidas may also refer to:

People

Antiquity
Leonidas I, Greek king of Sparta, ruled c. 489–480 BC
Leonidas II, Greek king of Sparta, ruled c. 254–235 BC
Leonidas of Rhodes, ancient Greek Olympic runner
Leonidas of Tarentum, Greek poet
Leonidas of Epirus, teacher of Alexander the Great

Saints
Saint Leonidas, any of several people

Modern times

Given name
Leonidas is a masculine given name mainly in Greece:
Leônidas da Silva, Brazilian football player
Leonidas Kestekides, founder of the Belgian chocolate company
Leonidas Alaoglu, American mathematician of Greek descent
Leonidas Bott (1889–1969), Australian cricketer
Leonidas Burwell, Canadian businessman and politician
Leonidas Ferreira de Paulo Junior, Brazilian football player
Leonidas M. Godley (1836–1904), American Civil War Union Army soldier; recipient of the Medal of Honor
Leonidas Hamline, 19th-century American Methodist clergyman and lawyer, and founding benefactor of Hamline University
Leonidas Kampantais, Greek footballer
Leonidas Kavakos, Greek violinist
Leonidas Kouris, Greek politician
Leonidas Kyrkos (1924–2011), Greek politician
Leonidas Langakis, Greek shooter
Leonidas Panagopoulos, Greek footballer
Leonidas Pantelides, Cypriot diplomat
Leonidas Paraskevopoulos, Greek military officer and politician
Leonidas Polk, Confederate general in the American Civil War
Leonidas L. Polk, agrarian leader and North Carolina's first Commissioner of Agriculture
Leonidas Pyrgos, Greek fencer
Leonidas I. Robinson, Third Lieutenant, USRC Bear
Leonidas Sampanis, Greek weightlifter
Leonidas Shaver (died 1855), Utah Territorial Supreme Court justice
Leonidas Skoutaris, Greek basketball player
Leônidas Soares Damasceno, Brazilian football player
Leonidas Tsiklitiras, Greek gymnast
Leonidas Varouxis, Greek journalist and a politician
Leonidas Vargas, Colombian drug lord
Leonidas Veliaroutis, Greek writer
Leonidas Vokolos, Greek footballer

Surname
Georgina Leonidas, British actress
Stephanie Leonidas, British actress

Nickname
Nate Ebner (nicknamed Leonidas), American football player in the National Football League

Other
Rafael Leónidas Trujillo Dominican President
Leonidas Witherall, fictional character created by Phoebe Atwood Taylor

Places
In the United States:
 Leonidas, New Orleans, Louisiana
 Leonidas, Minnesota
 Leonidas Township, Michigan

Vessels
Leonidas (ship), labour ship that brought the first indentured servants from India to Fiji in 1879
USS Leonidas, either of two ships in the US Navy
HMS Leonidas, either of two ships in the Royal Navy

Other uses
Leonidas (sculpture), a 5th-century BC sculpture
Leonidas at Thermopylae, a 19th-century oil painting by Jacques-Louis David
Leonidas, an 1894 secular oratorio by Max Bruch.
ELBO Leonidas-2, Greek-built armored personnel carrier
Leonidas Squadron (Leonidas Staffel), experimental Luftwaffe unit of suicide pilots that tested crewed versions of the V-1 flying bomb
Leonidas, the codename for Fedora 11
Leonidas (chocolate maker), a chocolate producer
RKSV Leonidas, a Dutch amateur football club from Rotterdam

See also
Leonid (disambiguation)
Leonides (disambiguation)

Greek masculine given names